Scandic Hotels is a hotel chain headquartered in Stockholm, Sweden, with its main operations in the Nordic countries. Alongside hotels in Sweden, Norway, Finland and Denmark, the company also has a presence in Germany and Poland. As of 31 December 2018, the company has 11,560 employees and operates 283 hotels with 51,693 guest rooms. The company has stated that is an ecologically sustainable business since 1994.

History 

The first hotel in what was later to become the Scandic chain was the Esso Motor Hotel in Laxå in the province of Närke, central Sweden. Opened in 1963, it capitalized on the increase in car travel, both for business and pleasure – the motel was a novel concept for Europe at the time. The chain grew to 59 hotels Europewide by 1972, when Esso sold the non-Scandinavian hotels. The remaining 32 hotels, five of them in Norway and Denmark, formed the largest hotel chain in its native Sweden in 1973.

In 1983, the company was sold to a Swedish consortium headed by Ratos and the following year, it was named Scandic Hotels. Ratos became sole owner in 1985, and a year later, the first hotel outside Scandinavia opened in Koblenz, Germany.

The business was negatively impacted by the 1990/91 Gulf Crisis, and company management was replaced in 1992. In 1996, the group acquired Reso Hotels and became a publicly traded company on the Stockholm Stock Exchange. Two years later, the Arctia Hotels group in Finland followed, giving Scandic a presence in all the Nordic countries, and in 1999, the group expanded into Estonia.

In 2001, Scandic was acquired by the London-based Hilton Group. The hotel chain changed ownership again in 2007, this time bought by Swedish private equity firm EQT for EUR 833 million. In July 2013, Scandic Hotels partnered with Swiss Hospitality to gear up its digital infrastructure. In 2014, Scandic acquired the Rica Hotels chain, which added 72 properties in Norway and Sweden to its portfolio.

In December 2015, Scandic once again was listed on the Stockholm Stock Exchange.

In 2014 Scandic Hotels launched its HTL hotel brand. In June 2016 the company dropped the brand. The brand was applied to four hotels of the group in Stockholm and Oslo, which were turned back into Scandic Hotels after the HTL brand was abandoned. In 2017, Scandic announced its buy-out of all 43 Restel hotels in Finland for 114.5 million euros, including those under the Cumulus and Holiday Inn brands.

In March 2020, more than half of Scandic's permanent employees were notified of layoffs as a result of the Coronavirus pandemic. In April of the same year, Scandic Hotels had a room occupancy of six percent, which was the lowest occupancy the hotel chain had ever had. The low occupancy and reduced revenue during the year led to Scandic reporting a loss of just over six billion for 2020.

Description 

As of 31 December 2018, the company employs 11,560 people and operates 283 hotels with 51,693 guest rooms. Operating result (EBITDA) for 2018 amounted to SEK 1,957 million.

Sustainability

Since 1994, Scandic profiles itself heavily as an ecologically sustainable business. Employees receive sustainability education and the company offers rooms built in an environmentally friendly way. In 2001, the breakfasts at all Swedish Scandics received the KRAV ecological product certificate, and by 2004, all Swedish hotels had earned the "Swan" ecolabel. Scandic has received national and international awards for its environmental efforts:

 St Julian Disability Award, S:t Julian – City of Stockholm, February 2006
 Glassbjörnen Environmental Award – GRIP Forum, Norway, May 2006
 Oslo’s Urban Environmental Prize – City of Oslo, Norway, June 2006
 Best Environmental Work – Grand Travel Awards, Sweden, March 2007
 Scandic Elmia & Scandic Portalen – Jönköping Municipality Environmental Award, June 2007
 Stilpriset Hjärter Ess för tillgänglighet – Stil, Sweden, September 2007
 Swedish Recycling Award, October 2007
 The Sustainability Award – European Hotel Design Awards, London, October 2007
 Best CSR Programme – Hospitality Awards, Paris, November 2007

Since 2015, the group got in line with the UN's Sustainable Development Goals. Scandic Hotels partnered with Too Good To Go and Karma to reduce food waste within its hotels.

See also

References

External links
 

Companies based in Stockholm
Hospitality companies established in 1963
Hotel chains
Travel and holiday companies of Sweden
Companies listed on Nasdaq Stockholm
Swedish companies established in 1963